Nova Aliança is a municipality in the state of São Paulo, Brazil. The population is 7,068 (2020 est.) in an area of 217.5 km². Nova Aliança belongs to the Mesoregion of São José do Rio Preto.

History 
In 1910, the families of Zeferino Gotardi, Jorge Galvão, Paschoal Proto, Gasparo Traldi and Luís Guilhermitti left São Joaquim da Barra, São Paulo, to settle in this region for its fertile soil which allowed for better farming. The name "Aliança" was chosen because the founders were originally from a farm called "Bela Aliança".

In the early twentieth century, the town of Monte Belo in the region faced rapid growth, most of which was in the agricultural sector. The population reached an estimated 500 inhabitants and urban development including homes and judicial buildings. The growth was soon interrupted by a malaria epidemic that killed many people.

Government 

 Mayor: Jurandir Barbosa de Moraes (2021-)
 Deputy mayor: Silvia Renata Patini Alves

Past mayors of Nova Aliança 
In chronological order:

 João Sperandéo - January 1945 to December 1945
 Dulcídio Siqueira -January 1946 to March 1947
 Simão Daud - April 1947 to December 1947
 Francisco Pereira dos Santos - January 1948 to July 1951
 João Sperandéo - July 1951 to December 1951
 Luiz Antonio Fleury - January 1952 to December 1955
 Benedito Soares Dias - January 1956 to December 1959
 Chicrala Boulos - January 1960 to December 1963
 Jorge Ayruth - January 1964 to January1969
 Chicrala Boulos - February 1969 to Juanuary 1973
 Demétrio Birelli - February 1973 to January 1977
 Waldemar Pala - February 1977 to January 1983
 Alfredo Gonçalves de Matos - February 1983 to January 1989
 Demétrio Birelli - February 1989 to December 1992
 José Augusto Fernandes - January 1993 to December 1996
 Jurandir Barbosa de Moraes - January 1997 to December 2000
 Jurandir Barbosa de Moraes - January 2001 to December 2004
 Augusto Donizetti Fajan - January 2005 to December 2012
 Jurandir Barbosa de Moraes - January 2013 to December 2016
 Augusto Donizetti Fajan - January 2017 to December 31st, 2019

Population

References

Municipalities in São Paulo (state)